Tokelau competed at the 2019 Pacific Games in Apia, Samoa from 7 to 20 July 2019. The country participated in six sports at the 2019 games.

Judo

Two athletes were selected to compete for Tokelau in Judo at the 2019 games.

Men
 Ilai Manu
 Peter Elekana

Lawn bowls

Netball

Outrigger canoeing

Two athletes were selected to compete for Tokelau in Va'a at the 2019 games.

Men
 Sefo Misky

Women
 Regina Perez

Rugby league nines

Tokelau has selected a men's team to compete in rugby league nines at the 2019 games.

Men's squad
 TBC

Touch rugby

Tokelau has selected a men's team to compete in touch rugby at the 2019 games.

Men's squad
 Lomi Gaualofa
 Tui Hope
 Simi Isaako
 Koro Koro
 Viane Manuele
 Isaac Misky
 Tino Pelesa
 Mose Pelasio Jr
 Onehimo Palesau
 Kanava Pue
 Timi Saumani Jr
 Tafahi Tavita
 Ioane Wright

References

Nations at the 2019 Pacific Games
2019